Born in 1820 Chaturvedi Shri Dwarka Prasad "Sharma" was a famous writer of Hindi prose who has written more than 150 books but primarily known for his translations of Valmiki Ramayana from Sanskrit to Hindi. 
He initially lived in Etawah Uttar Pradesh in India and eventually moved to Allahabad in UP. He is considered an early writer of Hindi prose. He lost his Government job when he wrote about life and character of Warren Hastings. He then devoted all of his time to writing and literature. He first started a monthly magazine called "Raghavendra".

Chaturvedi was arrangement minister in Hindi Sahitya Sammelan for many years and was given the title of "Sharma".

Books
Some of his main works (in Hindi) are:
 Warren Hastings
 Robert Clive
 Ramanujacharya 
 Allah
 Shabdarth Kaustubh (Sanskrit to Hindi Dictionary)
 Shabdarth Parijat (Hindi to Hindi Dictionary)
 Madhav Mishr Nibandhavali
 Valmiki Ramayan Hindi Anuvad (present-day Gujarat, India) 
 Bal Sahityamala Series (20+ books)

References

1820 births
Year of death missing
People from Etawah
Indian male writers